The 2023 Nigerian House of Representatives elections in Abia State will be held on 25 February 2023, to elect the 3 House of Representatives members from Abia State, one from each of the state's three senatorial districts. The elections will coincide with the 2023 presidential election, as well as other elections to the House of Representatives and elections to the Senate; with state elections being held two weeks later. Primaries were held between 4 April and 9 June 2022.

Overview

Summary

Aba North/Aba South  

The Aba North/Aba South Federal Constituency covers the local government areas of Aba North and Aba South. In 2019, Ossy Prestige (APGA) was elected to the seat with 54.4% of the vote but he died in February 2021. In the ensuing March 2021 by-election, Chimaobi Ebisike (PDP) was elected with 65.5% of the vote; he is seeking re-election.

General election

Results

Arochukwu/Ohafia  

The Arochukwu/Ohafia Federal Constituency covers the local government areas of Arochukwu and Ohafia. Incumbent Uko Nkole (PDP) was elected with 34.7% of the vote in 2019.
Nkole opted not to seek re-election instead running for the Abia North senate seat; he came second in the PDP primary.

General election

Results

Bende  

The Bende Federal Constituency covers the local government area of Bende. Incumbent Benjamin Kalu (APC), who was elected with 51.8% of the vote in 2019, is seeking re-election.

General election

Results

Isiala Ngwa North/Isiala Ngwa South  

The Isiala Ngwa North/Isiala Ngwa South Federal Constituency covers the local government areas of Isiala Ngwa North and Isiala Ngwa South. Incumbent Darlington Nwokocha (LP) was elected with 60.0% of the vote in 2019 as a member of the PDP. Nwokocha opted against running for re-election and decided to run for the Abia Central senate seat, defecting to the LP in June 2022 to become its senatorial nominee.

General election

Results

Isuikwuato/Umunneochi  

The Isuikwuato/Umunneochi Federal Constituency covers the local government areas of Isuikwuato and Umu-Nneochi. Incumbent Nkeiruka Onyejeocha (APC), who was elected with 52.2% of the vote in 2019, is seeking re-election.

General election

Results

Obingwa/Ugwunagbo/Osisioma  

The Obingwa/Ugwunagbo/Osisioma Federal Constituency covers the local government areas of Obingwa, Osisioma Ngwa, and Ugwunagbo. Incumbent Solomon Adaelu (APGA) was elected with 76.5% of the vote in 2019 as a member of the PDP. Adaelu originally sought re-election in the PDP but withdrew from the primary before defecting to APGA in May 2022 and obtaining its nomination.

General election

Results

Ukwa East/Ukwa West  

The Ukwa East/Ukwa West Federal Constituency covers the local government areas of Ukwa East and Ukwa West. Incumbent Uzoma Nkem-Abonta (PDP), who was elected with 43.4% of the vote in 2019, decided to run for senator for Abia South instead of seeking re-election; he later withdrew from the senatorial primary.

General election

Results

Umuahia North/Umuahia South/Ikwuano  

The Umuahia North/Umuahia South/Ikwuano Federal Constituency covers the local government areas of Ikwuano, Umuahia North, and Umuahia South. Incumbent Samuel Onuigbo (APC) was elected with 46.0% of the vote in 2019 as a member of the PDP; he decamped to the APC in December 2020. Onuigbo decided not to seek re-election, instead opting to run for senator for Abia Central.

General election

Results

Notes

See also 
 2023 Nigerian House of Representatives election
 2023 Nigerian elections
 2023 Abia State elections

References 

Abia State senatorial elections
2023 Abia State elections
Abia State House of Representatives elections